Christmas in Paradise is a 2007 American Lifetime television Christmas movie which originally aired on December 15, 2007.  Starring Charlotte Ross, Colin Ferguson, Devon Werkheiser, Josie Loren, Kenton Duty and Aria Wallace, the film tells the story of two families who find companionship during a Caribbean Christmas holiday, only to have their idyllic vacation disrupted by an unexpected visitor from the past.  The movie was filmed entirely on location on the island of Puerto Rico in 2007, and has subsequently been rebroadcast on Lifetime every year during the holiday season as an annual Christmas film.

Synopsis
Two families looking to escape painful holiday memories take a vacation to an exotic Caribbean island over Christmas. A widowed mother, Dana (Charlotte Ross), and her two sons, Chris (Devon Werkheiser) and Michael (Kenton Duty) meet a divorced father, Dan (Colin Ferguson), and his two daughters, Blair (Josie Loren) and Nell (Aria Wallace) when their cruise ship docks in Puerto Rico. Despite a rough start, the parents and kids begin to develop bonds over the course of their stay at a beautiful Puerto Rican beach resort. It looks like an idyllic Brady Bunch holiday for the two families as Dana and Dan try to put their personal tragedies behind them and begin to grow closer, until an unexpected visitor from the past appears and threatens their tentative romance. What promised to be a joyous Christmas filled with fresh hope and new relationships turns complicated as each member of the two families must sort out their feelings and choose their own path.

Cast

Home video
On October 18, 2011, Lifetime, in association with A&E Entertainment, released a double-feature DVD of Christmas in Pradise along with Deck the Halls in the North American Region 1 DVD format.

See also
 List of Christmas films

References

External links
 
 Christmas in Paradise at MyLifetime.com

American Christmas films
2007 television films
2007 films
Lifetime (TV network) films
2000s Christmas films
2000s English-language films
Films directed by Sheldon Larry